Squamanita citricolor is a species of fungus in the family Squamanitaceae. Found in the Democratic Republic of the Congo , it was first described as new to science in 1998. Fruit bodies of the fungus have a yellow cap, and a whitish to yellowish stipe originating from a yellowish, deeply rooting basal bulb in the shape of an inverted cone. Microscopically, the fungus features very thick-walled spindle-shaped (fusiform) pleurocystidia and cheilocystidia.

References

External links

Fungi described in 1998
Fungi of Africa